The Global Environment for Network Innovations (GENI) is a facility concept being explored by the United States computing community with support from the National Science Foundation.  The goal of GENI is to enhance experimental research in computer networking and distributed systems, and to accelerate the transition of this research into products and services that will improve the economic competitiveness of the United States.

GENI planning efforts are organized around several focus areas, including facility architecture, the backbone network, distributed services, wireless/mobile/sensor subnetworks, and research coordination amongst these.

See also 
 Internet2
 Future Internet
 AKARI Project in Japan

References

External links
 GENI home page
 NSF GENI Initiative overview.
 NSF GENI Project Office solicitation.
 Foreign, independent presentation on GENI.
 A news article describing GENI plans.
 A news article referring to GENI.
 Another news article  regarding GENI.

Computer network organizations